Yanis Djamil Barka (born 18 April 1998) is a French professional footballer who plays as a forward for Championnat National 2 club Beauvais.

Club career
Barka made his first professional appearance with Nancy in a 2–2 Ligue 2 tie with Ajaccio on 17 November 2017. He signed his first professional contract on 11 December 2017. On 17 December 2021, Barka joined Championnat National 2 side Beauvais on a deal until the end of the season. On 23 June 2022, he signed for Paris 13 Atletico in the Championnat National.

On 2 December 2022, Barka returned to Beauvais.

International career
Barka represented France at the 2017 Toulon Tournament, scoring a goal in his only appearance.

References

External links
 
 
 ASNL Profile
 
 

1998 births
Living people
People from Saint-Quentin, Aisne
Association football forwards
French footballers
France youth international footballers
French sportspeople of Algerian descent
Olympique Saint-Quentin players
AS Nancy Lorraine players
Marignane Gignac Côte Bleue FC players
AS Beauvais Oise players
Paris 13 Atletico players
Ligue 2 players
Championnat National players
Championnat National 3 players
Championnat National 2 players
Footballers from Hauts-de-France
Sportspeople from Aisne